The following is a timeline of major events during the Northern Mali conflict.

2012

January
16 January - 17 January: Battle of Menaka between the National Movement for the Liberation of Azawad (MNLA) and the army of Mali. On the 17th, fighting spread to towns of Aguelhok and Tessalit.
24 January: Battle of Aguelhok between the MNLA (and possibly Islamist groups like Al-Qaeda in the Islamic Maghreb and Movement for Oneness and Jihad in West Africa) and the army of Mali. When they surrendered, 97 members of the army of Mali were killed.

February
1 February: After regaining the town of Ménaka after the battle in January, the military of Mali retreats and the MNLA takes the town over.
2 February: Large-scale protests against the violence in the north take place in Bamako, the capital of Mali, and cause disruptions and shut down much of the city.

March
5 March: Units of the military of Mali fail to end the siege of the military garrison in Tessalit that had existed for weeks.
10 March: Spiritual leaders in Mali issue a call for peace. 
12 March: The MNLA (and allies) take over Tessalit.
14 March: Rebel forces took control of the towns of Diré and Goundam.
21 March: soldiers dissatisfied with the course of the conflict attacked Defense Minister Sadio Gassama as he arrived to speak to them at the Kati military camp.
21 March- 22 March: 2012 Malian coup d'état, disgruntled soldiers took over the capital city and on the morning of the 22nd, Amadou Konare went on state television, which identified him as the spokesperson of the National Committee for the Restoration of Democracy and State (CNRDR), formed by the renegade soldiers. Konare declared that the soldiers had seized power from 'the incompetent regime of Amadou Toumani Touré' and said it would look to hand over power to a new, democratically elected government. The coup was "unanimously condemned" by the international community,
30 March: Rebels captured Kidal and Ansongo and Bourem in Gao Region.
31 March: Rebels take over Gao.

April

1 April: Rebels attack Timbuktu Reports that Ansar Dine takes over the city and chases away MNLA fighters. 
2 April: ECOWAS and Mauritanian and Algeria place wide-ranging sanctions on the military government of Mali.
3 April: Armed groups looted 2,354 tons of food from United Nations' World Food Programme's warehouses in Kidal, Gao and Timbuktu, causing the WFP to suspend its operations in northern Mali.
4 April: Civil society and 50 political parties in Mali refuse to take part in a discussion with the military government on plans for the future.
5 April: Islamists, possibly from AQIM or MOJWA, entered the Algerian consulate in Gao and took hostages.
6 April: The MNLA declares independence of the northern part of Mali.
8 April: The National Liberation Front of Azawad (FNLA) announced its formation and intention to oppose Tuareg rule, battle the MNLA, and "return to peace and economic activity"; the group claimed to consist of 500 fighters.
8 April: President Amadou Toumani Touré resigns and Dioncounda Traoré is named interim President.

May
4 May: Ansar Dine members reportedly burned the tomb of a Sufi saint.
14 May: Protesters and the MNLA clashed in the city of Gao, reportedly injuring four and killing one.
26 May: MNLA and Ansar Dine agree to merge and create an independent state together. This alliance falls apart days later.

June
8 June: MNLA and Ansar Dine forces fight with one another in Kidal, killing two in the skirmish, as a result of protests in the city opposed to the imposition of Sharia law.
26 June - 27 June: Battle of Gao started when protesters opposed to Tuareg rule by the MNLA resulted in two deaths (allegedly by MNLA forces). MNLA and MOJWA began fighting in the city of Gao, resulting in an injury to Bilal ag Acherif, the MNLA Secretary General, and a retreat of MNLA from the city and others.
29 June: Islamists are in charge of most of northern Mali and the MNLA holds few cities. 
30 June: Destruction of tombs in Timbuktu by Islamist forces.

July
29 July: A couple was stoned to death by Islamists in Aguelhok for having children outside of marriage.

August
9 August, Islamist militants chopped off the hand of an alleged thief in the town of Ansongo, despite a crowd pleading with the militants for mercy.

September
1 September: MOJWA takes over the southern town of Douentza, which had previously been held by a Songhai secular militia, the Ganda Iso
8 September: Malian soldiers detained 17 unarmed Tablighi preachers from Mauritania in Dogofry (north of Diabaly) while en route to a religious conference in Bamako and executed all but one of them without reporting to their own command. The Malian government expressed its condolences for the incident, which Associated Press considered a symptom of the disintegration reached by the Malian Army as a result of the 21 March Coup.
24 September: A group broke off from the MNLA, calling itself the Front for the Liberation of the Azawad (FPA), aiming to focus efforts on fighting the Islamists.

October
12 October 2012: United Nations Security Council unanimously passes United Nations Security Council Resolution 2071 which approved the creation of the African-led International Support Mission to Mali (AFISMA).

November
11 November: Economic Community of West African States (ECOWAS) authorizes 3,000 troops for involvement in AFISMA. 
16 November: MNLA forces launch an offensive against Gao, but fail to retake the town.
19 November: MOJWA and AQIM forces took over the eastern town of Ménaka, which had previously been held by the MNLA.

December
11 December: Prime Minister Cheick Modibo Diarra is forced to resign by the military. 
20 December: The United Nations Security Council passes United Nations Security Council Resolution 2085 which approved the deployment of AFISMA and international action.

2013

January
4 January: A ceasefire between Ansar Dine and the army of Mali is ended by Ansar Dine claiming the terms were not met. 
10 January: Islamist forces captured the strategic town of Konna, located 600 km from the capital.
11 January: France launched Opération Serval, militarily intervening in the conflict. The operation included the use of Gazelle helicopters from the Special forces, which stopped an Islamist column advancing to Mopti, and the use of four Mirage 2000-D jets of the Armée de l'Air operating from a base in Chad. 12 targets were hit by the Mirages during the night between the 11th and the 12th. 
12 January: the British government announced that it was deploying two Royal Air Force C-17 transport planes in a non-combat role to ferry primarily French but also potentially African forces into Mali. 
14 January: Islamists attacked the city of Diabaly from the Mauritanian border where they fled to avoid the airstrikes. The AQIM leader known as Abu Zeid was leading the operation.
16 January: The prosecutor of the International Criminal Court opened a formal investigation of alleged war crimes in Mali.
16 January - 19 January: In Amenas hostage crisis. AQIM militants crossed the border from Mali into Algeria and captured an Algerian/Statoil/BP-owned natural gas field, In Aménas, near the border with Libya. They took a number of foreign workers hostage and 
14 January - 21 January: Battle of Diabaly begins with the Malian army, and possibly French special forces, fighting against Islamists in the city of Diabaly. Islamists retreated from the city by 18 January and the Malian military and French forces retook the city on 21 January without resistance.
18 January: Malian army reclaims control of Konna without resistance.
19 January: Residents of Gao had lynched Aliou Toure, a prominent Islamist leader and the MOJWA police commissioner of the city, in retaliation for the killing of a local journalist, Kader Toure.
19 January: Human Rights Watch report killings and other human rights abuses committed by the Malian army in the central Malian town of Niono. Tuaregs and Arabs were especially targeted.
19 January: Two Nigerian soldiers were killed and five were injured by Islamists near the Nigerian town of Okene as they were heading toward Mali.
25–27 January: Second Battle of Gao

February
9–11 February: 3rd battle of Gao
19 February-present: Operation Panther
20–23 February: 4th battle of Gao
22 February: Battle of Ifoghas
22–23 February: Battle of Khalil
27 February: Battle of Iminenas

March
6 March: Battle of Tin Keraten
12 March: Battle of Tigharghar
12–17 March: Battle of Djebok
20–21 March: Battle of Timbuktu
24 March: 5th Battle of Gao
29–30 March: Battle of In Arab
30 March-1 April: Second Battle of Timbuktu

April
12 April: 2013 Kidal suicide attack

May
4 May: Battle of Hamakouladji

2014

2015

2016

2017

2018

 11 January – Three French soldiers of the Barkhane force were wounded, one of them seriously, by a suicide bomber in eastern Mali.
 24 January – Two Malian customs officers have been killed in a suspected jihadist attack at a market in the small village of Toubakoro.
 1 July  - 
 Four French soldiers are wounded near Bourem when two VBCIs are hit by suicide bombers. Four civilians were also killed.
 A vehicle carrying several MSA fighters hit an explosive device, probably a mine, in the centre of the village of Talataye in the Ansongo Cercle of the Malian Gao region. Six fighters were killed and another injured in the incident.
 A suicide bomber drove a vehicle loaded with explosives into an army patrol and detonated it in the Malian city of Gao. Four civilians were killed and 31 others, including four French soldiers, wounded in the attack.

2019

 March 23 - Ogossagou massacre
 June 10 - Sobane Da massacre

2020

January 9–20 people, including 18 U.N. peacekeepers, were wounded following a rocket attack on a MINUSMA base in Tessalit, Kidal Region.
 January 26 - A Malian Armed Forces camp in Sokolo, Niono Cercle was attacked, leading to the deaths of 19 Malian soldiers.
 January 29 - Prime Minister Boubou Cisse announced his intention to hire 10,000 new soldiers for the Malian Armed Forces in order to combat jihadist groups.
 February 13 - A "reconstituted" battalion of the Armed Forces of Mali, incorporating former rebel soldiers, arrived at Kidal, becoming the first government soldiers to be based in the city since March 2012. The battalion was escorted by MINUSMA forces and based at Camp General Abdoulaye Soumaré.
 May 17: Malian Armed Forces returned to Labbézanga after they withdrew in November 2019
 June 3: Malian forces killed AQIM leader, Abdelmalek Droukdel in operation near Algerian border.

2022 
 October - The Islamic State in the Greater Sahara capture Ansongo
 December 16 - 2 Nigerian peacekeepers killed, 4 wounded in attack in Mali, UN says

References

!
Lists of armed conflicts in the 21st century
Northern Mali conflict